Birda (Hungarian and German: Birda) is a commune in Timiș County, Romania. It is composed of four villages: Berecuța, Birda (commune seat), Mânăstire and Sângeorge.

Geography 
Birda is located in the southeastern part of Timiș County, bordering the town of Gătaia and the communes of Tormac, Voiteg, Opatița and Denta.

Climate 
The climate is temperate continental, having an intermediate character between the continental, Mediterranean and oceanic climates. Winters are relatively mild, summers are long and hot, springs and autumns are short. The average annual temperature is 10.6 °C, and the average annual rainfall is 600–700 mm, ensuring very good conditions for plant cultivation and animal husbandry.

History 
The first recorded mention of Birda dates from 1690, from Marsigli's notes. It is probably much older and inhabited during the Turkish occupation. By 1717 Birda is recorded in the Habsburg imperial documents with 80 houses; Berecuța with 28 houses; and Sângeorge with 30 houses. After 1779, it belonged to Temes County, Plasa Deta, with a post office and later a train station. In 1828, the Aerarium sold Birda to the Termacici family. By 1842 it is the property of Baron Lo Presti. In 1852 it came into the possession of Baron Ukermann's wife. Until the end of the 19th century, Birda was inhabited only by Romanians, but at that time, the great owners settled German and Hungarian families here to cultivate their estates.

The commune of Birda was established by Law 84/2004, separating from the town of Gătaia.

Demographics 

Birda had a population of 1,846 inhabitants at the 2011 census, down 5% from the 2002 census. Most inhabitants are Romanians (86.62%), larger minorities being represented by Serbs (3.47%), Ukrainians (1.52%) and Hungarians (1.14%). For 5.36% of the population, ethnicity is unknown. By religion, most inhabitants are Orthodox (85.1%), but there are also minorities of Pentecostals (3.74%), Serbian Orthodox (2.65%) and Roman Catholics (1.46%). For 5.31% of the population, religious affiliation is unknown.

References 

Communes in Timiș County
Localities in Romanian Banat